COSMOSPACE (COSMO Surface-Pair Activity Coefficient Equation) is an activity coefficient model in which the activity coefficient of the components in a
liquid chemical mixture can be related through their molar fraction.  It was initially developed as an implicit solution to COSMO-RS.

While UNIQUAC is a first order approximation, COSMOSPACE gives the exact solution of a lattice model in which pairwise molecule surfaces interact. Therefore, COSMOSPACE outperforms Uniquac in the description of vapor–liquid and liquid–liquid phase equilibria.

See also 
  UNIQUAC
  UNIQUAC
  COSMOSPACE
Chemical equilibrium
Chemical thermodynamics
Fugacity

References 

Thermodynamic models